The 2017–18 season is Queen of the South's fifth consecutive season back in the second tier of Scottish football and their fifth season in the Scottish Championship, having been promoted as champions from the Scottish Second Division at the end of the 2012–13 season. Queens will also be competing in the Challenge Cup, League Cup and the Scottish Cup.

Summary
Queens finished sixth in the Scottish Championship for the second consecutive season.

Queens reached the fourth round of the Challenge Cup, losing to The New Saints after a penalty shoot-out 4-3, with no goals scored after extra time.

The Doonhamers were knocked out after the first round of the League Cup after the completion of fixtures in Group G that included Albion Rovers, East Kilbride, Hamilton Academical and Stenhousemuir.

Queens reached the fourth round of the Scottish Cup, losing 2-1 at Palmerston to Partick Thistle.

Results and fixtures

Pre season

Scottish Championship

Scottish Challenge Cup

Scottish League Cup

Scottish Cup

Player statistics

Captains

|-

Squad 
Last updated 28 April 2018

 

 
 

|}

Disciplinary record

Top scorers 
Last updated 28 April 2018

Clean sheets
{| class="wikitable" style="font-size: 95%; text-align: center;"
|-
!width=15|
!width=15|
!width=15|
!width=150|Name
!width=80|Scottish Championship
!width=80|Challenge Cup
!width=80|League Cup
!width=80|Scottish Cup
!width=80|Total
|-
|1
|GK
|
|Alan Martin
|8
|1
|1
|1
|11
|-
|20
|GK
|
|Jack Leighfield
|3
|2
|0
|0
|5
|-
|
|
|
! Totals !! 11 !! 3 !! 1 !! 1 !! 16

Team statistics

League table

Division summary

Management statistics
Last updated 28 April 2018

Transfers

Players in

Players out

See also
List of Queen of the South F.C. seasons

Notes

References

Queen of the South F.C. seasons
Queen of the South